Go-Ahead Singapore is a contracted bus operator operating in Singapore. It commenced operations on 4 September 2016 and it is a subsidiary of the Go-Ahead Group.

History

On 15 April 2015, the Land Transport Authority called for tenders to operate 25 routes based at Changi Airport Bus Terminal, Changi Village Bus Terminal, Pasir Ris Bus Interchange, and Punggol Bus Interchange out of Loyang Bus Depot as part of its new Bus Contracting Model. Busways, Go-Ahead Group, Keolis, RATP Dev Transdev Asia, SBS Transit, SMRT Buses, Tian Tan Shipping/Kumho Buslines and Woodlands Transport lodged bids.

On 23 November that year, the Land Transport Authority awarded Go-Ahead Singapore the contract with Go-Ahead Singapore to commence operations on 4 September and 18 September 2016 respectively. The contract will run for five years with a two years extension if it meets LTA's requirements. 

On 11 December that year, the Land Transport Authority handed over Loyang Bus Depot to Go-Ahead Singapore to allow it to be fitted out.

On 19 June 2016, the Loyang Bus Depot was officially opened by MP for Pasir Ris-Punggol Group Representation Constituency, Zainal Sapari and the Group Chief Executive of the Go-Ahead Group David Brown. Loyang Bus Depot Carnival was also held on the same day to allow the public to tour the depot and also learn more about Go-Ahead Singapore.

On 21 September that year, Go-Ahead Singapore found itself short of staff less than three weeks after launching its services. A total of 30 SBS Transit drivers were deployed at Loyang Bus Depot to operate services 358 and 359, while SMRT Buses sent 10 drivers to help the new public bus operator operate service 85. Tower Transit Singapore was also engaged to supply a staff bus service for Go-Ahead employees at Loyang Bus Depot.

On 30 November that year, Go-Ahead Singapore's managing director Nigel Wood left due to "personal reasons". He has since resumed his position with Go-Ahead London as its general manager.

Bus Routes

Go-Ahead Singapore commenced operations of 24 services in two tranches. 13 bus services commenced services on 4 September 2016, while another 11 has started on 18th of that month. All services were previously operated by SBS Transit. Later, Service 381 was introduced on 12 March 2017, followed by Service 12e on 28 January 2018. On 1 April that year, Service 68 was launched. On 2 January 2019, Go-Ahead Singapore took over the right to operate City Direct Service 661 from Aedge Holdings. On 9 September that year, Express Service 43e was introduced. On 2 March 2020, Go-Ahead Singapore took over the right to operate City Direct Service 666 from BT&Tan Transport. On 27 December that year, Service 384 was launched, bringing up the services operated by Go-Ahead Singapore up to 31 services.

Bus Fleet

Single decker buses
CRRC C12
MAN NL323F Lion's City (A22)
Mercedes-Benz Citaro
Yutong E12

Double decker buses
MAN ND323F Lion's City DD (A95)
Volvo B9TL Wright Eclipse Gemini 2
Yutong E12DD

Formerly operated
BYD K9
CRRC C12

References

External links

Bus companies of Singapore
Go-Ahead Group companies
Transport companies established in 2016
Transport operators of Singapore
Singaporean brands
Singaporean companies established in 2016